Like a Virgin (literally Strong Man Under Heaven Madonna) is a 2006 South Korean comedy-drama film written and directed by Lee Hae-jun and Lee Hae-young. Ryu Deok-hwan stars in the lead role as transgender teenager Oh Dong-ku, and won several domestic awards for his performance, as well as a nomination for the Asia Pacific Screen Award Best Performance by an Actor. The film's English title is a reference to a Madonna song of the same name.

Plot 
Chubby high school student and Madonna-devotee Oh Dong-ku is a trans woman living with her abusive, alcoholic father. Dong-ku works part-time to save money for the sex reassignment surgery she craves. Despite being told that she has the perfect physique for ssireum, Dong-ku has no interest in taking up sports—but when she finds out about an upcoming ssireum tournament with a large cash prize going to the winner, she changes her mind and signs up for the team.

Cast 
 Ryu Deok-hwan as Oh Dong-ku
 Baek Yoon-sik as Coach
 Lee Sang-ah as Dong-ku's mother
 Lee Eon as Park Joon-woo
 Moon Se-yun as Big guy 1
 Kim Yong-hoon as Big guy 2
 Yoon Won-seok as Big guy 3
 Park Young-seo as Jong-man
 Tsuyoshi Kusanagi as Japanese teacher
 Kim Yoon-seok as Dong-ku's father
 Kim Kyeong-ik as Jin-chul
 Oh Yoon-hong as Company president's wife
 Choi Jung-woo as Company president
 Kwak Min-seok as Priest
 Kim Do-yeon as Large female employee
 Kim Won-sik as Oh Dong-chul
 Kwon Oh-jin as Worker
 Jang Nam-yeol as Homeroom teacher
 Lee Jae-gu as Employee at labor office
 Kim Tae-joon as Choir member at concert hall
 Kwon Jae-won as Lawyer

Awards and nominations

References

External links 
 
 
 
 

2006 films
2000s sports comedy-drama films
2000s high school films
2006 LGBT-related films
2000s teen comedy films
2000s teen drama films
Films directed by Lee Hae-young
2000s Korean-language films
LGBT-related sports comedy-drama films
South Korean high school films
South Korean LGBT-related films
South Korean sports comedy-drama films
South Korean teen films
Ssireum films
Teen LGBT-related films
Teen sports films
Films about trans women
2006 directorial debut films
2006 comedy films
2006 drama films
2000s South Korean films